Schartau is a surname. Notable people with the surname include:

Frans-Albert Schartau (1877–1943), Swedish sport shooter 
Henric Schartau (1757–1825), Swedish Lutheran pietistic clergyman